The following is a list of people engaged in spying for Germany.

Pre-WWI

World War I

Interwar period

World War II

Post WWII

See also
 History of espionage

References

Spies
German intelligence agencies
Spies